

Arthropods

Insects

Archosauromorphs

Newly named dinosaurs

Paleontologists
 Death of pioneering French paleontologist Jacques Amand Eudes-Deslongchamps.

References

1860s in paleontology
Paleontology
Paleontology 7
Paleontology, 1867 In